Gevil or gewil or  is a type of parchment made from full-grain animal hide that has been prepared as a writing material in Jewish scribal documents, in particular a Sefer Torah (Torah scroll).

According to most views of Jewish law, a Sefer Torah (Torah scroll) should be written on gevil parchment, as was done by Moses for the original Torah scroll he transcribed. Further, a reading of the earliest extant manuscripts of the Mishneh Torah indicate that gevil was halakha derived from Moses and thus required for Torah scrolls.

Maimonides wrote that it is a law given to Moses at Sinai that a Torah scroll must be written on either gevil or klaf in order to be valid, and that it is preferable that they be written on gevil.

Etymology
Related to גויל, gewil, a rolling (i.e. unhewn) stone, cf. :he:wiktionary:גול, "to roll." (Jastrow)

Definition
Gevil is a form skin for safrut (halakhic writing) that is made of tanned, whole hide. The precise requirements for processing gevil are laid down by the Talmud, Geonim and Rishonim.
Rabbi Ḥiyya bar Ami said in the name of Ulla: There are three [untanned] hide [stages before it is tanned into gevil]: Matza, ḥifa, and diftera.
א"ר חייא בר אסי משמיה דעולא ג' עורות הן מצה חיפה ודיפתרא —.
According to Jewish law, the preparation of gevil must include salt, flour and mey afatzim (wasp residue/gall-nut water). 
These requirements were reconfirmed as a Law given to Moses at Sinai by Maimonides, in his Mishneh Torah. 
Gall nuts—rich in tannic acid—are a tree's reaction to an invasive parasitic wasp's egg; the pure black tint of the ink used on Torahs results from the reaction between the tannic acid and iron sulfate (a powder used to make the ink).

There are three forms of tanned skin known to Jewish law. The other two forms (klaf and dukhsustus) result from splitting the hide into two layers. The rabbinic scholars are divided upon which is the inner and which is the outer of the two halves. Maimonides is of the opinion that  was the inner layer and that  was the outer layer 
The Shulchan Aruch rules in the reverse that  was the outer layer and that  was the inner layer  The opinion of the Shulchan Aruch is the accepted ruling in all Jewish comunities.
Recently a small group has advocated for the return to using the full hide known as gevil for Sifrei Torah as it avoids this issue, but unfortunately this solution won't work for tefilin which must be written on klaf and are not kosher if written on gevil.

Uses
According to the Talmud, Moses used gevil for the Torah scroll he placed into the Ark of the Covenant. Elsewhere in the Talmud, there is testimony that Torah scrolls were written on gevil.

Today, a handful of Jewish scribes and artisans continue to make scroll material in this way. However, the majority of Torah scrolls are written on klaf, in their belief that the Talmud recommends (as opposed to requires) gevil and relates to the optimal beautification of the scrolls rather than an essential halachic requirement. Given the uncertainty about which layer of the hide is in fact the klaf, there is a growing movement for insisting on a return to gevil in Torah scrolls in order to avoid all doubts.

Most of the Dead Sea Scrolls (200 BCE), found in and around the caves of Qumran near the Dead Sea, are written on gevil.

Properly, klaf should be used for tefillin and duchsustus for mezuzot. However, this rule isn't an obligation is just a preference and Klaf is used for Mezuzot as well today but there is a minority which seeks to return to the actual law.

See also
 Ktav Stam

References

External links
 The Gevil Institute: Machon Gevil  The only online organization dedicated to the preservation of gevil.
 https://web.archive.org/web/20080410134250/http://www.ccdesigninc.com/MishmeresStam/Leaflet.pdf

Hides (skin)
Book design
Jewish law and rituals
Writing media
Uses of leather in Judaism
Torah
Hebrew words and phrases in Jewish law